Dillon v. Gloss, 256 U.S. 368 (1921), was a case in which the Supreme Court of the United States held that Congress, when proposing a constitutional amendment under the authority given to it by Article V of the Constitution, may fix a definite period for its ratification, and further, that the reasonableness of the seven-year period, fixed by Congress in the resolution proposing the Eighteenth Amendment is beyond question. Additionally, the Court, upon taking judicial notice that the Eighteenth Amendment became a part of the Constitution on January 16, 1919, when its ratification in the state legislatures was consummated, held that the National Prohibition Act, known informally as the Volstead Act, entered into force on January 16, 1920.

Background
Dillon had been arrested pursuant to the National Prohibition Act, title 2, § 3, and was in custody under § 26.  He was denied his petition for a writ of habeas corpus, and appealed the denial. Dillon claimed that the Eighteenth Amendment, which Title 2 of the act was adopted to enforce, was invalid, because the Congress, in declaring that it should be inoperative unless ratified within seven years, had acted outside its constitutional authority; and, secondly, that, in any event, the law he was charged with violating, and under which he was arrested, had not gone into effect at the time of the asserted violation nor at the time of his arrest on January 17, 1920.

Syllabus
 Article V of the Constitution implies that amendments submitted thereunder must be ratified, if at all, within some reasonable time after their proposal. This was modified in 1939 by Coleman v. Miller, which ruled that proposed amendments with no specified expiration pend ratification before the States indefinitely.
 Under Article V, Congress, in proposing an amendment, may fix a reasonable time for its ratification.
 The period of seven years, fixed by Congress in the resolution proposing the Eighteenth Amendment was reasonable.
 The Eighteenth Amendment became a part of the Constitution on January 16, 1919, when, as the Court notices judicially, its ratification in the state legislatures was consummated, not on January 29, 1919, when the ratification was proclaimed by the Secretary of State.
 As the Eighteenth Amendment, by its own terms, was to go into effect one year after being ratified, §§ 3 and 26, Title II, of the National Prohibition Act, which, by § 21, Title III, were to be in force from and after the effective date of the Amendment, were in force on January 16, 1920. P. 256 U. S. 376.

The lower court's ruling was upheld.

See also
Coleman v. Miller
List of United States Supreme Court cases, volume 256

References

External links

1921 in United States case law
United States Supreme Court cases
United States Supreme Court cases of the White Court
United States Constitution Article Five case law
Prohibition in the United States
United States Eighteenth Amendment case law